Acuclavella is a genus of thorn harvestmen in the family Ischyropsalididae, found in the Pacific Northwest. There are about seven described species in Acuclavella.

Acuclavella was formerly a member of the family Ceratolasmatidae, but was moved to Ischyropsalididae, along with Ceratolasmatidae which became the subfamily Ceratolasmatinae.

Species
These seven species belong to the genus Acuclavella:
 Acuclavella cosmetoides Shear, 1986
 Acuclavella leonardi Richart and Hedin, 2013
 Acuclavella makah Richart and Hedin, 2013
 Acuclavella merickeli Shear, 1986
 Acuclavella quattuor Shear, 1986
 Acuclavella sheari Richart and Hedin, 2013
 Acuclavella shoshone Shear, 1986

References

Further reading

External links

 

Harvestmen